George Thomas (died 1951) was an American academic administrator. He served as the president of the University of Utah from 1921 to 1941.

References

1951 deaths
Presidents of the University of Utah